The Acceptance World is the third book of Anthony Powell's twelve novel sequence, A Dance to the Music of Time.  Nick Jenkins continues the narration of his life and encounters with friends and acquaintances in London, between 1931 and 1933.

References

See also
Planchette

Novels by Anthony Powell
A Dance to the Music of Time
1955 British novels
Fiction set in 1931
Fiction set in 1932
Fiction set in 1933
Novels set in London
Heinemann (publisher) books